Mbandja (Banja, Mbanza) is the largest of the Banda languages. There are 350,000 speakers in DRC, 10,000 in the Republic of Congo, and an unknown number in CAR.

Phonology

Consonants 

 [ŋ] mainly occurs as a sound of /n/, when preceding a velar consonant.

Vowels

References

Languages of the Democratic Republic of the Congo
Languages of the Republic of the Congo
Languages of the Central African Republic
Banda languages